The 1957 Calgary Stampeders finished in 3rd place in the W.I.F.U. with a 6–10 record. They were defeated in the W.I.F.U. Semi-Finals by the Winnipeg Blue Bombers.

Regular season

Season standings

Season schedule

Playoffs
WIFU Semi-Finals

Winnipeg won the total-point series by 28–16. The Blue Bombers will play the Edmonton Eskimos in the WIFU Finals.

Awards and records
 None

References

Calgary Stampeders seasons
1957 Canadian football season by team